FC Nelson is a football club, based in the South Island city of Nelson, their home ground is Guppy Park.

History
The team was founded in 2011 through the amalgamation of Nelson United (founded 1968), Nelson Metro (founded 1975), Nelson City (founded 1977) and Tahunanui When they merged they had over 900 members across junior, youth, men's and women's teams, making it the largest club in the Nelson/Marlborough region.

Nelson United played in the old New Zealand National Soccer League's top flight 1977–80, 1983–88, and 1991–93. They were winners of the 1977 Chatham Cup, and were finalists in 1978. Nelson Metro best run in the Chatham Cup was in 1976 where they made it to the fourth round before losing to Waterside Karori. Nelson City best run was in the 1977 Chatham Cup, making it through to the third round before losing to other local club Nelson Suburbs.

FC Nelson has continued the tradition of playing in the Chatham Cup, entering each year since the club was formed. The club usually doesn't get past round one or round two however in 2016, the club made it to the third round in the Chatham Cup. The club also entered a women's team for the first time in the Kate Sheppard Cup in 2013, where they went on to make the second round after beating University of Canterbury 1–0.

FC Nelson has won the Nelson Division One trophy a number of times, including 2012 and 2013. Then they didn win it again before going into the final game of the 2017 season, the club just needed to win but ended up beating Wakefield 10–0, holding off Richmond Athletic for the trophy. They followed that up winning again in 2019. The club has also won the Nelson Women's league in 2014.

In 2021, FC Nelson open its new academy, linking the best youth talent with high-quality coaching. The club also formed a partnership with Nelson College to give players access to opportunities to the academies and coaches, while still being able to play for their school team. They followed this up by signing a Memorandum of Understanding with Nelson College for Girls in February.

References

External links
FC Nelson website

Association football clubs in New Zealand
Sport in Nelson, New Zealand
1968 establishments in New Zealand
Association football clubs established in 1968